Marie-Hélène Beaulieu (born 1979) is a Canadian glass artist. She was born in Rouyn-Noranda, Quebec. She studied at the Centre des métiers du verre du Québec. In 2006 she co-founded the Atelier Sébomari with fellow glass artist Sébastien Duchang.  In 2015 she received the Prix Jean-Marie Gauvreau.

Her work is included in the collections of the Musée national des beaux-arts du Québec and  the Montreal Museum of Fine Arts

References

1979 births
Living people
Artists from Quebec
Canadian glass artists
People from Rouyn-Noranda
21st-century Canadian women artists